Bujar Bukoshi (born 13 May 1947 in Suva Reka, FPR Yugoslavia, now Kosovo  was the prime minister of the self-proclaimed Republic of Kosova from 1991 to 2000. He served as the minister of Healthcare in Kosovo. He graduated from the University of Belgrade's Medical School. Bukoshi is one of the founders of the Democratic League of Kosovo and was elected leader of the party. He was the deputy prime minister of Kosovo in the second Thaçi cabinet from 2011 to 2014.

References

Notes

1947 births
Living people
People from Suva Reka
University of Belgrade Faculty of Medicine alumni
Democratic League of Kosovo politicians
Deputy Prime Ministers of Kosovo